Stef Doedée (born 17 February 1987) is a Dutch former professional footballer who played as a goalkeeper for Feyenoord, RKC Waalwijk, FC Dordrecht, Inter Turku, ASWH and VV Smitshoek.

Career
Doedée played in the Netherlands for Feyenoord, RKC Waalwijk and Dordrecht. He signed for Finnish club Inter Turku in August 2012, signing a contract until end of season 2012. From 2013 he was under contract at ASWH with which he ascended to the Derde Divisie (2016) and Tweede Divisie (2019). He did not actually play in the Tweede Divisie as he had previously signed to transfer to Hoofdklasse-side VV Smitshoek.

Immediately after ending his player career in 2021, he signed as goalkeeping coach for the 2nd, U23, and U19 teams of ASWH.

References

1987 births
Living people
Dutch footballers
FC Dordrecht players
People from Sint-Michielsgestel
ASWH players
RKC Waalwijk players
Feyenoord players
FC Inter Turku players
Eerste Divisie players
Veikkausliiga players
Association football goalkeepers
Dutch expatriate footballers
Expatriate footballers in Finland
Dutch expatriate sportspeople in Finland
Derde Divisie players
Vierde Divisie players
VV Smitshoek players
Footballers from North Brabant